Burnaby Now is a local tabloid newspaper published weekly by Glacier Media to 47,000 residents and businesses in Burnaby, British Columbia, Canada.

The first edition was a 12-page broadsheet format issued on November 23, 1983 which was a week after the final publication of 123-year-old The Columbian newspaper.

See also
List of newspapers in Canada

References

External links
Burnaby Now – Official website

Mass media in Burnaby
Glacier Media
Weekly newspapers published in British Columbia
Publications established in 1983
1983 establishments in British Columbia